Sir James Caird  (10 July 1816 – 9 February 1892) was a Scottish agriculturist, agricultural writer and politician. His views were based on economic liberalism which led to him forming an advisory relationship to Sir Robert Peel and later under Benjamin Disraeli. He examined the Irish famine and still later served on the commission to examine the famines in India.

Life

Born at Stranraer, the son of James Caird and Isabella McNeil, Caird was educated at Edinburgh High School and University of Edinburgh. He was Member of Parliament for Dartmouth from 1857 to 1859 and for Stirling Burghs from 1859 to 1865.

He started as a progressive farmer at Baldoon and then became a land-owner at Kirkcudbrightshire. He grew to become a voice of the  free-trade farmer and thus represented economic liberalism of the period. In 1849, he wrote High Farming as the best Substitute for Protection. The work caught the attention of the Conservative Prime Minister, Sir Robert Peel, who saw Caird as a well-informed commentator. Peel invited Caird to examine agriculture and the famine in Ireland. Caird subsequently represented the "Peelite" position on economics and famine relief. In 1850 he wrote The Plantation Scheme: Or, the West of Ireland as a Field of Investment. He toured America, and Canada.

He was appointed a Fellow of the Royal Society in 1865 and President of the Royal Statistical Society in 1880-1882 and was made a Privy Counsellor in 1889. Caird travelled to India from October 1878 to join a commission of famine inspectors. He held opinions that the Indian administrators did not appreciate. He was of the opinion that famine relief should be aimed to save life and was against fitness tests and wage payment against work for Indians. He believed that Indian governance needed fundamental change with peasants receiving payment in kind with handling of harvest variability. He even considered that land revenue superstructure including the Indian Civil Services needed pruning or even abolition. He was senior member of the Land Commission in 1882. He was director of the land department of the Board of Agriculture from 1889 to 1891.

He was appointed a CB in 1869 and promoted to KCB in 1882.

He died on 9 February 1892 and was buried on the eastern side of Highgate Cemetery.

Works
 English Agriculture in 1850-51 (London, 1852)
 The Plantation Scheme; Or, the West of Ireland as a Field of Investment (Edinburgh, 1850)
  via Internet Archive

Notes

References

External links 
 
 Famine Commission Report

1816 births
1892 deaths
Burials at Highgate Cemetery
Fellows of the Royal Society
Members of the Privy Council of the United Kingdom
Members of the Parliament of the United Kingdom for Dartmouth
Members of the Parliament of the United Kingdom for Scottish constituencies
Knights Commander of the Order of the Bath
People from Stranraer
Presidents of the Royal Statistical Society
19th-century Scottish businesspeople
UK MPs 1857–1859
UK MPs 1859–1865
Alumni of the University of Edinburgh
People educated at the Royal High School, Edinburgh
Members of the Parliament of the United Kingdom for Stirling constituencies